Liski is a rural locality (a selo) in Zaluzhenskoye Rural Settlement, Liskinsky District, Voronezh Oblast, Russia. The population was 2,490 as of 2010. There are 12 streets.

Geography 
It is located 15 km south of Liski (the district's administrative centre) by road. Zaluzhnoye is the nearest rural locality.

References 

Rural localities in Liskinsky District